Jacques-Philippe-Augustin Douchet (? – ?) was an 18th-century French lawyer, grammarian and encyclopédiste.

Life 
Douchet worked as a lawyer at the Parlement de Paris. Later he taught Latin at the Parisian École royale militaire.

As an author he wrote about the general principles of the French language and in 1762 laid the rules of French spelling fixed, including his comments on the debate.

In 1765, César Chesneau Dumarsais died, who hitherto contributed on the topic of grammar for the Encyclopédie by Denis Diderot. After his death, Douchet and Nicolas Beauzée - both teachers at the École Royale Militaire - took over his work.

References

Works 
 Principes généraux et raisonnés de l'orthographe françoise, avec des remarques sur la prononciation. chez la Veuve Robinot (1762)

Bibliography 
  Nicolas Le Moyne Des Essarts: Les Siècles littéraires de la France. Paris 1800, (p. 632).

External links 
 Jacques-Philippe-Augustin Douchet on data.bnf.fr
  Autorités Sudoc, bio- und bibliographische Informationen
 J. P. A. Douchet on Wikisource

18th-century French lawyers
Grammarians from France
Contributors to the Encyclopédie (1751–1772)
18th-century births
18th-century deaths